The Johansen Islands are a group of small, low, partly snow-free islands lying within Lazarev Bay and Wilkins Sound,  west-northwest of Cape Vostok, at the northwest end of Alexander Island, Antarctica.

See also 
 List of Antarctic and sub-Antarctic islands
 Dint Island
 Merger Island
 Umber Island

References

Islands of Alexander Island
Landforms of Alexander Island